Amir Hassan Cheheltan; (born 1956) is an Iranian writer. He has published 12 novels, 6 volumes of short stories and a screenplay of which some are banned in Iran and many of them are translated into English, German, Italian, Norwegian, Lithuanian, Arabic and Hebrew.

Life
Cheheltan was born in Tehran in 1956 to parents with an interest in classical Persian literature. After graduating from a mathematics high school, he studied electrical engineering and after the Iranian Revolution of 1979, he left Iran for Great Britain to keep studying. After his studies he served in the military during the Iran Iraq war.

Literary career 
His first work was a collection of stories, Sigheh (Temporary Wife), which was released in 1976. Later he wrote his first novel, The Mourning of Qassem, that was only to be published until in 2003, twenty years after it was completed. Due to a difficult situation for the countries intellectuals, he fled Iran in 1999 and only returned two years later. He has been an guest at the International Literature Festival of Berlin for several years and his essays have been published in German newspapers such as the Frankfurter Allgemeine Zeitung and Süddeutsche Zeitung. He has received scholarships from the German Heinrich Böll Foundation, the Ledig House in Belgium or the Villa Aurora in California.

Works

novels
 The Mourning of Qassem, Now, Tehran 1984
 Hall of Mirrors, Beh-negar, Tehran, 1991
 Tehran, City without Sky, Negah, Tehran, 2002
 Love and the Incomplete Woman, Negah, Tehran, 2003.
 Iranian Dawn, Negah, Tehran, 2005
 Tehran, Revolution Street, Kirchheim, München, 2009
 American Killing in Tehran, C.H. Beck, München, 2011
 The Calligrapher of Isfahan, C.H. Beck, München, 2015
 The Persistent Parrot, Matthes & Seitz, Berlin, 2018
 The Circle of Literature Lovers, C.H. Beck, München, 2020
 A love in Cairo, C.H. Beck, München, 2022

short stories
 Temporary Wife, Bu-ali, Tehran, 1976
 Relic-cloth on the Shrine's Steel Grillwork, Rawagh, Tehran, 1978
 No One Called me Anymore, Negah, Tehran, 1993
 Not Long remains till Tomorrow, Negah, Tehran, 1998
 Five O'clock is too Late to Die, Negah, Tehran, 2002
 Several Unbelievable Truths, Negah, Tehran, 2017

Awards
 International Literature Award for The Circle of Literature Lovers in 2021

References 

1956 births
Writers from Tehran
20th-century Iranian writers
Living people
Iranian male novelists
21st-century Iranian writers
Iranian male short story writers
Iranian writers in German
20th-century short story writers
20th-century novelists
21st-century novelists
21st-century short story writers
Iranian expatriates in Germany
Iranian military personnel of the Iran–Iraq War
Iranian expatriates in the United Kingdom